Kalluru or Kallur is a mandal in the Khammam district of Telangana, India.

Demographics
Kalluru mandal has a population of 63,336 while Kalluru town, which is the headquarters, has a population of 15,807 (2011 census).
 Kalluru mandal has a literacy rate of 41% while the headquarters has a literacy rate of 72 (2011 Census).

Temples 
Kalluru has a famous temple of Lord Shiva known as Srikashmira Mahadevakshetram, Anjaneya Swamy temple, Kanaka Durga temple, Ganesh temple, Venugopalaswamy temple and Shirdi Said Baba temple. Both Vijayawada Kanakadurga temple and Bhadrachalam temple 100 km from this town.

References 

Mandals in Khammam district